Hovea chorizemifolia, commonly known as the holly-leaved hovea, is a species of flowering plant in the family Fabaceae and is endemic to the south-west of Western Australia. It is a small, upright shrub with prickly, green leaves and blue-purple pea flowers.

Description
Flowering occurs from May to October and the fruit is a round pod.

Taxonomy and naming
Hovea chorizemifolia was first formally described by the botanist Augustin Pyramus de Candolle, in 1825 in his Prodromus Systematis Naturalis Regni Vegetabilis. The classification of the species has been revised many times including by Robert Sweet in 1827 as Plagiolobium chorizemifolium in Flora Australasica and as Hovea chorozemaefolia by John Lindley in 1832 in Edwards's Botanical Register. The specific epithet  (chorizemifolia), derives from Chorizema and the latin, folium, meaning leaf and thus means leaves resembling those of Chorizema.

Distribution
It occurs on hills, breakaways and granite outcrops in the South West, Peel and Great Southern regions of Western Australia where it grows in sandy and gravelly lateritic soils and often as part of jarrah forest communities.

References

chorizemifolia
Rosids of Western Australia
Plants described in 1825
Taxa named by Augustin Pyramus de Candolle